The 1944 United States presidential election in Washington took place on November 7, 1944, as part of the 1944 United States presidential election. Voters chose eight representatives, or electors, to the Electoral College, who voted for president and vice president.

Washington was won by incumbent President Franklin D. Roosevelt (D–New York), running with Missouri Senator Harry S. Truman, with 56.84% of the popular vote, against Governor Thomas E. Dewey (R–New York), running with Ohio Governor John Bricker, with 42.24% of the popular vote.

Results

Results by county

See also
 United States presidential elections in Washington (state)

References

Washington (state)
1944
1944 Washington (state) elections